Sabrina Chong Sook Chin (born 23 April 1987) is a Malaysian badminton player. She was part of the Malaysia junior team that won the silver medal at the 2005 Asian Junior Championships in the girls' team event after defeated by the Chinese team in the final. Chong joined the Malaysia squad that won the women's team gold medal at the 2009 Southeast Asian Games, and the team were awarded Best Female Olympians by the Deputy Prime Minister and Olympic Council of Malaysia. Partnered with Lim Khim Wah, they clinched the mixed doubles title at the 2010 Malaysia International tournament.

Achievements

BWF International Challenge/Series 
Women's doubles

Mixed doubles

 BWF International Challenge tournament
 BWF International Series tournament

References

External links
 

1987 births
Living people
People from Selangor
Malaysian sportspeople of Chinese descent
Malaysian female badminton players
Competitors at the 2009 Southeast Asian Games
Competitors at the 2011 Southeast Asian Games
Southeast Asian Games gold medalists for Malaysia
Southeast Asian Games bronze medalists for Malaysia
Southeast Asian Games medalists in badminton
21st-century Malaysian women